Page-turner is a person employed to turn sheet music pages for a soloist or accompanist.

Page-turner may also refer to:

 Page Turner (TV series)
 The Page Turner